The Bresle is a river in the northwest of France that flows into the English Channel at Le Tréport. It crosses the departements of Oise, Somme and Seine-Maritime.

Introduction 
For a long time, the course of the Bresle (especially the lower part) has had the role of a natural national frontier, serving as the boundary between powerful and often antagonistic political entities. It separated the Roman provinces of Belgian Gaul from Lyonnais Gaul, the Talou county (Dieppe) and the Vimeu during the Merovingian period, the county of Ponthieu, France and the Duchy of Normandy from the 10th century and also the taxation areas of Rouen and Amiens under the Ancien Régime.

Today, the half-Norman, half-Picardy verdant, lake-filled valley carries on its traditional quality glass industry that started in the Middle Ages. The presence of numerous small enterprises dotted around the small towns and villages along its banks hasn't compromised the rich environment, which has a wide variety of flora and fauna that thrive. The quality of the water of the Bresle is such that salmon and sea-trout can be found in great number.

Etymology 
In his Géographie, Ptolemy called it the Phroudis.
Until the 13th century, various other names were given to the river: Auvae fluvium, Aucia fluvium, Auga in the 10th century and Ou in the 11th century. When the Normans arrived, they called it the Brisela. It has been subsequently noted in various documents as Bresla, Brella, Breselle, Briselle, Brisele, Brisella before the definitive name was agreed at the end of the 17th century.

Geography 

The Bresle starts its life at Abancourt, a commune of the Oise, at around 200 metres above sea-level and flows northwest over the plateau of Formerie, receiving more water from small tributaries along the way (the Ménillet and the Méline). At Senarpont, it's joined by the Liger, its main tributary. It then takes a turn to the west-northwest, the same direction as most rivers of the Seine-Maritime and the Somme. 
After having received the waters of the Vimeuse at Gamaches, the river splits into several branches (the Teinturerie and the Busine) at Eu and a part is canalised between Eu and Le Tréport.
Between these two last places, the Bresle flows into a wide grassy valley one kilometre wide, framed by steep edges and dropping by 100 metres into the wooded dry valleys. This valley shows evidence of the former course of the river when it used to meet the sea at Mers-les-Bains up until the Middle Ages. The former estuary forms a part of Eu today, in a district known as the "Prairie". 
In the 12th century, the redirecting of the course of the Bresle, rather than digging a canal, brought its outlet to Le Tréport.

The valley of the Bresle forms the northern part of the Paris Basin, made up of chalk of the  Cretaceous period. As it is porous, the basin contains natural aquifers, very important in maintaining a water supply for both irrigation of crops and drinking water.

Flora and fauna 

The valley has a huge range of plants varying from orchids, sedges, bracken and cranberry to trees such as juniper and beech (notably ‘’asperulo-fagetum). 
Common animals in the upper valley include the wild boar, red deer and wild cat, but it’s also home to rarer creatures, four types of bat and four kinds of damselfly, including the Coenagrion mercuriale, not found anywhere else in France. 
Many wildfowl winter in the valley, such as the little grebe, the great crested grebe and coots.

 Angling 
The Bresle has plenty of fishing for all kinds of anglers, from sea-trout in the lower valley and brown trout upstream, to huge carp, pike, roach and bream in both the lakes and the river. 

 Places of interest 
Museums devoted to the glass industry are open to the public at Eu (musée "Traditions verrières") and at Blangy-sur-Bresle (at the manoir de Fontaine). They show the history of glass and bottle-making, the different stages of the process (from the base materials through to packaging), the tools and modern machines, the  collections of perfume bottles and demonstrations of glass-blowing by experts.

The signposted Chemin des étangs (eng:the lakes path) allows walkers and cyclists to roam the lower part of the valley, between Eu and Incheville.Many aquatic activities (sailing, canoeing etc.) can be enjoyed on the hundreds of lakes formed by the river.

 Bibliography 
 J.-C. Lecat, La région industrielle de la Bresle, Études normandes, n°222, 3e trimestre 1969.
 Jacques Hétru, Le verre: l’art et la matière, Éd. Bertout, Luneray, 1996 
 Philippe Gillet, Pochet Le Courval, Les maîtres du verre et du feu : quatre siècles d’excellence, Perrin, Paris, 1998 
 Albert Hennetier, Aux sources normandes: Promenade au fil des rivières en Seine-Maritime, Éd. Bertout, Luneray, 2006 
 J.-L. Mériaux, J. Duvigneaud, J.-R. Wattez, M. Coste et F. Sueur, Étude inter-agences. Connaissance et fonctionnement des milieux aquatiques. Relevés floristiques. Déterminations taxonomiques et physico-chimie sur 12 cours d’eau français. Application aux rivières Aa et Bresle. Agence Eau Seine-Normandie, AMBE, 1995, 72 p.
 J.-L. Mériaux, J. Duvigneaud, J.-R. Wattez, M. Coste et F. Sueur, Étude inter-agences. Connaissance et fonctionnement des milieux aquatiques. Relevés floristiques. Déterminations taxonomiques et physico-chimie sur 12 cours d’eau français. Fichier Bresle''. Agence Eau Seine-Normandie, AMBE, 1995, 579 p.

Notes

External links 

  Website  of the Institution Interdépartementale Oise, Seine-Maritime et Somme
 Website about the history of glassmaking in the valley of the Bresle.
  Suggests walks in the valley of the Bresle.

Rivers of France
Rivers of Oise
Rivers of Seine-Maritime
Rivers of Somme (department)
Rivers of Hauts-de-France
Rivers of Normandy
0Bresle